Peltigera shennongjiana is a species of terricolous (ground-dwelling), foliose lichen in the family Peltigeraceae. Found in Central China, it was formally described as a new species in 2016 by Liu-Fu Han and Shou-Yu Guo. The species epithet refers to the type locality.

Description
Peltigera shennongjiana is a member of the Peltigera canina species group, but is distinguished from these similar lichens by presence of abundant isidia, phyllidia, and flat, branched lobules positioned along the margin or along cracks in the lamina. The apothecia are oriented vertically, and have red-brown to dark brown apothecial discs. Its ascospores have between three and six septa, and measure 32.0–58.0 by 2.0–6.0 μm. The photobiont partner is a cyanobacteria from the genus Nostoc. The only lichen product detected was an unidentified triterpenoid.

References

shennongjiana
Lichen species
Lichens described in 2016
Lichens of China